Jasmina Holbus (born 21 November 1968) is a Serbian stage designer, poet and interior designer.

Design Work 
Holbus graduated from Chelsea College of Arts in London in 1996, with a degree in interior design. She has been a member of the Association of Writers of Serbia since 1993 and a member of The Applied Artists and Designers Association of Serbia since 2007, holding the status of an independent artist. 

She has been professionally engaged in interior design since 1997 and has designed residential and commercial spaces. Since 2015, she has been the co-owner and the director of a company that has designed and built a number of residential buildings in Belgrade.

Holbus lives and works in Belgrade. She has a son Alex Julius Holbus from a former marriage with Yugoslav-Serbian ice hockey player Mirko Holbus.

Bibliography  
Holbus has been engaged in literary work since 1990. She took part in the Festival Voix Vives de méditerranée en méditerranée 2016, a poetry festival in Sète in France. Her poetry is translated into French and published published by Al Manar, within the edition of the poetry festival in 2016.

She has published thirteen collections of poems: 
 Noći uzdaha (Nights of Sighs), Prometej, Novi Sad, 1990.(COBISS.SR 3167239)
 Ne mogu pobeći (I Can’t Escape), Prosveta, Belgrade, 1993.(COBISS.SR 51439111)
 Gde prestaje reč (Where Words Stop), Rad, Belgrade, 1994.(COBISS.SR 29573644)
 Bela (White), Plato, Belgrade, 2002.(COBISS.SR 99564812)
 Nemir (Unrest), Plato, Belgrade, 2002.(COBISS.SR 99564300)
 Šestar (Caliper), Plato, Belgrade, 2002.(COBISS.SR 99565068)
 Slagalica (Jigsaw), Plato, Belgrade, 2006.(COBISS.SR 131309324)
 Repozicija (Reposition), Plato, Belgrade, 2010.(COBISS.SR 174830860)
 Tempo, Plato, Belgrade, 2013.(COBISS.SR 218927628)
 Hipotenuza (Hypotenuse), Zlatno Runo, Belgrade, 2015.(COBISS.SR 216700428)
 Izbor (Choice), selection of poems from the previous ten published books, Zlatno Runo, Belgrade, 2015.(COBISS.SR 216700172)
 L’hypoténuse at autre poèmes, published by Al Manar,France, 2016
 Ampula (Ampoule), Zlatno Runo, Belgrade, 2021. (COBISS.SR-ID 46695177)

Theatre set design 
She has been engaged as a stage designer since 2003 in the creation of more than thirty theatre productions.

Participation in other projects and exhibitions 
Jasmina Holbus was an Art director of the project Bojan Z. Sextet in Sava Centre in Belgrade and Synagogue in Novi Sad in 2013. She was the author of video works for the tour of Shelter with a View jazz album – piano concert of Bojan Zulfikarpašić, France, Belgium, Netherlands, and Switzerland 2014/2015. She was the author of various multimedia projects in architecture, graphic design and audio-video installations – Barcelona Art Biennial, 2005. She participates in group exhibitions of the applied arts in the country on regular basis. She is the author of Let's Talk Multimedia Art Research Project, at "Štab" gallery Belgrade 2016.

Awards  
 2009 - GRAND PRIX FOR BEST PLAY MIRA TRAILOVIĆ presented by BITEF Festival ″Dreamers″ by Robert Musil, directed by Miloš Lolić | production Yugoslavian Drama Theatre
 2013 - ANNUAL AWARD FOR BEST SCENOGRAPHY presented by The Association of Fine Arts Artists & Designers of Serbia, for special artistic contribution in the production of ″Othello″ by W. Shakespeare, directed by Miloš Lolić | Yugoslav Drama Theatre
 2017 - SPECIAL AWARD FOR ARTISTIC ACHIEVEMENT | XII Festival of Mediterranean Theater Purgatory ″Macbeth″ by W. Shakespeare, choreography by M. Isailović Production Bitef Theater (Serbia) & Cultural Center (Montenegro)
 2018 - AWARD FOR BEST PLAY | ″Nord-Ost″ (North East) by Torsten Buchsteiner, directed by Jana Maričić | production Bitef Theater & Beo Art, Presented by audience at the Borin Theater Days, Serbia 
 2018 - ARDALION - AWARD FOR BEST SCENOGRAPHY | XXIII Yugoslavian Theater Festival (Serbia) ″Five life’s of sad Milutin″ by Milena Marković, directed by Alexandra Milavic Davies Production Atelier 212; Belgrade, Serbia 
 2019 - ANNUAL AWARD FOR THE BEST ARTISTIC ACHIEVEMENT | ″Nathan der Weise″ by Gotthold Ephraim Lessing, directed by Jovana Tomić | Yugoslavian Drama Theatre, Serbia 
 2021 - ANNUAL AWARD FOR THE BEST SET DESIGN & special artistic contribution in the production of ″Kaspar″ by Peter Handke, directed by Miloš Lolić | Yugoslavian Drama Theatre

References

External links 

 
 
 
 

1968 births
Living people
Theatre people from Belgrade
Serbian women poets
Serbian designers
Writers from Belgrade